The Golf Club 2 is a golf sports video game developed by HB Studios and published by Maximum Games for Microsoft Windows, PlayStation 4 and Xbox One. Released in 2017, it is the sequel to 2014's The Golf Club and the second installment of the PGA Tour 2K series.

Reception

The Golf Club 2 received "mixed or average reviews" for Xbox One and "generally favorable reviews" for PlayStation 4, according to review aggregator Metacritic.

References

External links
 

2017 video games
Golf video games
PlayStation 4 games
Video games developed in Canada
Windows games
Xbox One games
Maximum Games games
Multiplayer and single-player video games
HB Studios games